John Ridley (26 May 1806 – 25 November 1887) was an English miller, inventor, landowner, investor, farming machinery manufacturer, farmer and preacher who lived in Australia between 1839 and 1853. He is best known for the development, manufacture and invention of "Ridley's Stripper", a machine that removed the heads of grain, with the threshing being done later by a separate machine. The suburb of Ridleyton in the city of Adelaide, Australia was named for him.

Early life
Ridley was born near West Boldon, County Durham, England. His father, also John Ridley, was a miller who died when his son was five years old. His mother, Mary (a cousin of John Sr.), carried on the business; when Ridley was 15 years of age he began to share in its management. Ridley had little formal education, but had a love of books and a remarkable memory. He had come across an encyclopaedia soon after he was able to read, and took the greatest interest in the scientific articles which he read and re-read. Science and theology were the great interests of his life. He began preaching at 18, and at 23 was a recognised local preacher in the Sunderland circuit.

After his mother's death in 1835, Ridley married Mary Pybus, and in November 1839 sailed for South Australia aboard the Warrior with his wife and two infant children, arriving in Adelaide on 17 April 1840.

Career in Australia
On arrival in South Australia he bought a piece of land at Hindmarsh close to Adelaide, took over the flour-mill of the South Australian Company, installed the first steam engine (a Watt's Beam) in South Australia able to cut wood and grind meal, and began growing wheat at Hindmarsh. Foreseeing that the heavy spending by governor George Gawler would lead to depression and increased rural production, Ridley let his farm and devoted his time to seeking grain for his mill, purchasing land, and investing in the developing copper-mine at Burra. Being much interested in mechanical inventions, he also spent some time on a horizontal windmill to be used for raising water. It was said of him at this period that if his child cried in the night, his first thought would be how to make an apparatus for rocking the cradle.

By 1843 the colony's expanding wheat crop threatened to exceed the capacity of the work force available to harvest it. Ridley gave much time to the problem of devising a mechanical method of harvesting the wheat and building a reaper based on a woodcut in John Claudius Loudon's An Encyclopaedia of Agriculture (3rd ed., London, 1835). In September 1843 the corn exchange committee offered a prize of £40 to anyone submitting a model or plans of a reaper of which the committee would approve. Ridley did not compete because his machine was nearing completion in the factory of John Stokes Bagshaw. On 23 September 1843 it was reported that several models and plans had been submitted, but no machine had been exhibited which the committee felt justified in recommending for general adoption. In October Ridley's machine was ready for its first tests, and a month later a rebuilt machine was successfully tested on his tenant's crop, reaping  in a week. On 18 November 1843 the Adelaide Observer announced that "a further trial of Mr Ridley's machine has established its success". Over the next year he planned the improvement and manufacture of the machine, in 1845 he made seven machines, and by 1850 over 50 machines were operating in the colony and others had been exported. The Ridley stripper received a Historic Engineering Marker from Engineers Australia as part of its Engineering Heritage Recognition Program.

Return to England
Although Ridley's returns from the harvesting machine were substantial, they were meagre compared with the dividends from his original shares in the Burra copper-mine, his flour-mill and his land investments. He was in comfortable circumstances, and in 1853 he and his family left Australia for a lengthy journey through Europe. After several years they eventually settled in England where he devoted "his eccentric enthusiasm to invention and religion". At his own cost he had printed tens of thousands of copies of sermons and tracts that appealed to his principles and distributed them widely to grateful and ungrateful recipients. He was also an energetic lay preacher and made many gifts to evangelical churches and missions.

Legacy
Ridley died on 25 November 1887 in London and was survived by two daughters. A silver candelabrum, presented to him by old South Australian colonists in 1861, is now at the Waite Agricultural Research Institute.

He was commemorated in 1933 by the erection of the Ridley Gates at the Adelaide Showgrounds, Wayville.

The Adelaide suburb of Ridleyton and Ridley Grove, a thoroughfare in the suburbs of Ferryden Park and Woodville Gardens, were named for him.

Controversy regarding the inventor of the Stripper 

For more than 140 years an argument has continued, off and on (and sometimes acrimoniously) over the invention of the South Australian wheat "stripper". Some, such as G. L. Sutton (1937), have claimed that the real inventor was a farmer, John Wrathall Bull (1804–1886), and that Bull's idea was stolen and then commercially exploited by the Hindmarsh flour-miller John Ridley (1806–1887). Indeed, following Sutton, most modern Australian agricultural and general historians have accepted this view without question, and incorporated it into their own works. Ridley and his supporters, however, always staunchly denied the charge (which was originally laid by J.W. Bull in 1845), insisting that Ridley himself was the sole and unaided inventor.

Although it was claimed that the machine was invented in principle by John Wrathall Bull, none disputed that Ridley was its first practical producer. In 1844 he was awarded a special prize by the Agricultural and Horticultural Society and in 1858 he was thanked by the South Australian parliament for a service that had helped to make possible the vast increase of wheat-growing in the province.

The rival claims of Bull and Ridley to the title of inventor of the stripper were the subject of long controversy. In 1843 Ridley had the limelight. The controversy was revived in 1875. Supported by influential friends and by mechanics who had made the original harvesting machine, Bull petitioned parliament in 1880 for a grant in recognition of his invention. After long inquiry he was given £250 in 1882 "for services in improving agricultural machinery".

Bull claimed that he was the real inventor of Ridley's reaping machine, his claims are set out in his volume Early Experiences of Colonial Life in South Australia. Bull sent in a model that was rejected by the committee, and his contention was that Ridley had seen his model and constructed his machine on its principles. Ridley, a man of the great probity, denied this, and his denial is borne out by the fact that his machine had had two successful trials within two months of the models being exhibited. In those days a machine could be constructed in Adelaide only by primitive methods, and it would have been virtually impossible to make a machine, overcome all the practical difficulties of adjustment, and have it in working order in so little time.

Bull devised an idea for a machine based on the comb and beater principle which reaped and threshed on his Mount Barker farm in 1842. He had the assistance of his good friend, brother-in-law and respected colonist Thomas Hudson Beare to create a working model for exhibition at the Corn Exchange committee meeting in 1843. "Having no wish for any personal gain, he donated his design for the good of the colony". "Much to Bull's surprise, John Ridley, (who exhibited no machine, or any proposals for one, at the Corn Exchange committee meeting), later emerged with a machine which was based on similar principles to those designed by Bull". Many other colonists backed Bull in testimonials and letters which appear in his book and also papers of the day.

In Ridley's final letter to the Adelaide Register written in 1886, he said that the first suggestion of his machine had come from a notice of a Roman invention given in John Claudius Loudon's Encyclopaedia of Agriculture, and that "from no other source whatever did I receive the least help or suggestion".

Both Bagshaw and John Dunn, who were involved in the manufacture and testing of Ridley's prototype, supported his claim.

More recent work by L. J. Jones presented at the Second National Conference on Engineering Heritage in 1985 states:

Notes

References
J. W. Bull, Early Experiences of Colonial Life in South Australia (Adelaide, Printed at the Advertiser, Chronicle and Express Offices, 1878).
 Facsimile edition (Adelaide, Libraries Board of South Australia, 1972). 
D. Davis, As Fine A Crop – The Lives of the Wrathall, Bull, Bowyer Family Pioneers in South Australia (Glebe/Batemans Bay, NSW, Self Published, 2000).
F. Johns & B. S. Roach, An Australian Biographical Dictionary (Melbourne & London, Macmillan & Co., 1934).
J. C. Loudon, An Encyclopaedia of Agriculture (3rd ed., London, 1835). 
S. Parsons, John Ridley
A. E. Ridley, A Backward Glance: the story of John Ridley, a pioneer (London, J. Clarke, 1904).
G. L. Sutton, "The Invention of the Stripper", Journal of the Department of Agriculture of Western Australia, vol 14, no 3, September 1937, pp 94–247.
Observer, Adelaide, 18 November 1843.
Register, Adelaide, 22 September 1886.
The Advertiser, Adelaide, 15 September 1932.

External links
Encyclopaedia of Agriculture online book

1806 births
1887 deaths
19th-century Australian inventors
Settlers of South Australia
Australian flour millers and merchants
19th-century Australian businesspeople